Fabriogenia dilga is a species of spider wasp within the genus Fabriogenia, and was described by Howard Ensign Evans.

Description
Body colour, wings and hair are the same as Fabriogenia canberra but the difference is in Fabriogenia dilga having a shorter antennae and shorter postnotum. Differences also exist in the shape of the clypeus and wing venation details.
Evans noted in his description that "dilga" is an Australian Aboriginal word from New South Wales that means "a stick of wood".  He assumed the species nests in cavities in wood since his examples were reared from a trap-nest.

References 

Insects of Australia
Insects described in 1972
Pompilidae